The Eighteenth District School at one time also known as Washington Elementary School is a registered historic building in Cincinnati, Ohio.

Description and history
The school was built in two sections the earlier in 1882 designed by Samuel Hannaford and Harry Bevis. It was listed in the National Register of Historic Places on March 3, 1980 as part of the Samuel Hannaford & Sons thematic resource.

Photo gallery

See also
 Historic preservation
 History of education in the United States

References

External links 
 
 

National Register of Historic Places in Cincinnati